The Karnataka State Film Awards 2007–08, presented by Government of Karnataka, to felicitate the best of Kannada Cinema released in the year 2007.

Lifetime achievement award

Jury 

A committee headed by Kesari Haravoo was appointed to evaluate the awards.

Film Awards

Other Awards

References

Karnataka State Film Awards